Estabrook is a surname. Notable people with the surname include:

Anne Evans Estabrook, American politician
Charles E. Estabrook (1847–1918), American politician
Christine Estabrook, American actress
Experience Estabrook (1813–1894), American lawyer and legal administrator
G. Estabrook (1845–1897), pen name used by American composer and singer Caroline Augusta Clowry
Helen Estabrook, American film producer
Howard Estabrook (1884–1978), American actor, film director, producer and screenwriter
Iris Estabrook (born 1950), American politician
James Estabrook (1796–1874), American sheriff
Joseph W. Estabrook (1944–2012), American Roman Catholic bishop
Mike Estabrook (disambiguation), multiple people
Prince Estabrook, American slave

Fictional characters
Fay Estabrook, a character from the 1949 novel The Moving Target and its 1966 film adaptation Harper

See also
Estabrooks